Leila Karam (1928 – 2 December 2008) was a Lebanese actress. Her major contributions were in the 1970s and 1980s in many Lebanese and Egyptian movies, plays and TV series of Tele Liban.

Career
Karam began her career in broadcast media in 1956, at Near East Radio. Soon after television came to Lebanon in 1959, she starred as the mother in the series Abou Melhem.

Her last role was as Carine Rizkallah's mother in Marte W Ana in 2000

Personal life
Karam was married, and had one son. Her elder sister Nabila Karam was also actress. She died on 2 December 2008 in a hospital in Beirut after a long illness.

Filmography

Quotes
"They don't remember us except when we are dead, that is if they do, so why should we remember them or show our admiration."

References

http://www.alraimedia.com/alrai/Article.aspx?id=96943

Lebanese film actresses
Lebanese stage actresses
Lebanese television actresses
2008 deaths
1928 births